Pociumbeni is a commune in Rîșcani District, Moldova. It is composed of two villages, Druța and Pociumbeni.

Notable people
 Victor Catan 
 Valentina Tăzlăuanu

References

Communes of Rîșcani District